Little Hell Creek is a  long 2nd order tributary to the Trent River in Jones County, North Carolina.

Course
Little Hell Creek rises about 2 miles east of Ravenswood, North Carolina and then flows north to join the Trent River about 1.5 miles west-northwest of Pollocksville.

Watershed
Little Hell Creek drains  of area, receives about 54.3 in/year of precipitation, has a wetness index of 616.36, and is about 9% forested.

See also
List of rivers of North Carolina

References

Rivers of North Carolina
Rivers of Jones County, North Carolina